Karen Kopins Shaw (born October 10, 1961) is a former American actress and former model.

Early life
Kopins was born on October 10, 1961. Kopins attended Ridgefield High School and graduated from Marymount College before moving to California to pursue an acting career. 

She was Miss Connecticut 1977, having entered the pageant as Miss Ridgefield.

Career 
Kopins starred in films Fast Forward, Creator, Once Bitten, opposite Jim Carrey, and Jake Speed, and appeared in guest roles in various television shows, such as The A-Team and Riptide. During seasons 11 and 13 of Dallas, she played Kay Lloyd, a love interest of Bobby Ewing. She was cast as one of Charlie's Angels in the unaired spinoff Angels '88. Kopins had a small role in an episode of Amazing Stories, one of two directed by series creator Steven Spielberg.

Personal life 
In 1990, Kopins married her high school sweetheart, Marc Shaw, with whom she has four children. The family resides in Redding, Connecticut.

Filmography

Film

Television

References

External links
 

1961 births
Living people
Actresses from Connecticut
American film actresses
American television actresses
Female models from New York (state)
20th-century American actresses
People from Redding, Connecticut
Marymount College, Tarrytown alumni
21st-century American women